RegionAir is an airline headquartered in port-Gentil, Gabon. It focus on regional flights in Central and West Africa. RegionAir works strictly as a charter airline to companies in the oil & gas industry and does not sell tickets to the general public.

Destinations

Douala (Douala International Airport)

Port-Gentil (Port-Gentil International Airport) Hub

Port Harcourt (Port Harcourt International Airport)

Pointe-Noire (Pointe Noire Airport)

Airfleet
 1 Embraer 120

References

External links
 Official website 

Airlines of Gabon
Gabonese companies established in 2007
Airlines established in 2007